The  signed as Route B, is one of the routes of the tolled Shuto Expressway system in the Greater Tokyo Area. The Bayshore Route is a  stretch of toll highway that runs from the Kanazawa ward of Yokohama in the west, northeast to the city of Ichikawa in Chiba Prefecture in the east. Opened in phases beginning in 1976 and ending in 2001, it is an important route that runs between the artificial islands lining the western shore of Tokyo Bay by way of bridges and sub-sea tunnels that bypass central Tokyo.

Route description

The Bayshore Route is a tolled expressway in the Shuto Expressway network of the Greater Tokyo Area and the only route of the network that serves Chiba Prefecture. It is called Route B after its name in English, Bayshore. The road was constructed by the Metropolitan Expressway Company as a motorway to add capacity to the existing National Route 357. It now runs parallel to the older road, which is used by more local traffic. For administrative purposes, the expressway is also designated on prefecture-level as Route 294 by Chiba Prefecture, Kanagawa Prefecture and Tokyo.

The western terminus of the Bayshore Route lies at the eastern end of a spur route of the Yokohama–Yokosuka Road in the Kanazawa ward of Yokohama. The Bayshore Route runs from Yokohama across the Yokohama Bay and Tsurumi Tsubasa Bridges, through the Kawasaki Subsea, the Tama Subriver, Haneda Airport North, and Tokyo Bay Subsea Tunnels, which connects it to the popular tourist spot of Odaiba, and then on to Urayasu (near Tokyo Disneyland) in Chiba Prefecture. The expressway facilitates direct road travel between Chiba and Kanagawa prefectures as well as Narita and Haneda Airports. It also serves to link the ends of all of Tokyo's ring roads, aside from the Inner Circular Route. As a result, it is used as a bypass for the heavily congested city center of Tokyo. Owing to the nature of the route from Kanagawa passing through Tokyo to Chiba, the direction of travel is represented in Japanese by "eastbound/westbound" rather than the Japanese norm of "up/down" direction that only functions relative to the direction one is traveling and Tokyo. The eastern terminus of the Bayshore Route connects to the southern terminus of the Higashi-Kantō Expressway and the eastern end of the Tokyo Gaikan Expressway at Kōya Junction.

Traffic
The Ministry of Land, Infrastructure, Transport and Tourism (MLIT), conducts surveys on the Japan's national routes and expressways every five years to measure their average daily traffic. In 2015, the most utilized point along the expressway was in the Kōtō ward of Tokyo between Tatsumi Junction and Shinkiba, where a daily average of 163,404 vehicles traveled on the Bayshore Route. The least busy section of the expressway was in Yokohama between its western terminus and the interchange at Sugita, there it carried an average of only 27,268 vehicles. Generally, the expressway is more heavily used between Haneda Airport and Chiba Prefecture. From Haneda to Yokohama, traffic levels slowly drop, then decline sharply beyond Honmoku Junction.

Cargo from Narita International Airport in Chiba destined for southern areas travels on large trucks on the Bayshore Route, though the opening of Chubu International Airport helped ease heavy truck congestion on the expressway. It is notable as Tokyo's first offshore highway, providing sightseers with urban views of Minato Mirai 21, Odaiba, the Rainbow Bridge, downtown Yokohama, and the Yokohama Bay Bridge. Although the expressway is heavily congested during the day, it is frequented by street racers during late night hours. From the late 1980s all the way to 1999 there was a presence on the Bayshore Route with street racers racing along the expressway's long, straight stretches; however, due to increased police presence the street racing scene has since dwindled.

History

The first section of the Bayshore Route was completed in August 1976 between Ōi and Rinkai-fukutoshin. It was expanded in stages with the earlier phases of construction generally taking place in Tokyo and Chiba. The first section of the expressway to open in Kanagawa Prefecture, where later phases of the expressway's construction were completed, opened in January 1989. The Bayshore Route was selected in April 2000 to be one of two trial routes of the Shuto Expressway network for the implementation of electronic toll collection (ETC). The ETC system was popular among the route's drivers and was implemented throughout the network in December 2003. The final link in the expressway's route was opened in October 2001 when the expressway was completed between the interchanges at Sugita and Sankeien.

There have been several developments on the Bayshore Route since its completion in 2001. Between 2004 and 2008, the expressway was widened to four lanes in each direction in a series of projects in the wards of Minato and Kōtō. The first of these widening projects was completed in 2004 on the westbound side of the expressway between Shinkiba and Tatsumi Junction on 17 September 2004. The final stage of the project was completed in March 2008 with the widening of the eastbound section of the Bayshore Route between Tatsumi and Ariake Junction. Part of this expansion project also made room for the addition of Shinonome Junction where the Bayshore Route meets the southern terminus of the Harumi Route. The junction was opened on 11 February 2009.

On 4 March 2017, the interchange at Minami-honmoku futō in Yokohama was completed, providing a direct connection from the Bayshore Route to Honmoku Wharf by a  viaduct. Kōya Junction was expanded on 2 June 2018 to add the Tokyo Gaikan Expressway to the highways served by the terminal junction of the Bayshore Route.

Junction list

In popular culture
 Wangan Midnight, a manga and anime series based on street racing on the Wangan.
 Wangan Midnight Maximum Tune, an arcade racing game taking place on the Wangan.
 Tokyo Xtreme Racer, known in Japan as Shutokō Battle (首都高, abbreviation for "Shuto Expressway"), a Genki game based on Wangan racing

See also
Shuto Kosoku Trial, a series of six movies about Wangan racing that have been banned from Japan.

References

External links

Shuto Expressway
1976 establishments in Japan
Roads in Chiba Prefecture
Roads in Kanagawa Prefecture
Roads in Tokyo